The Wendelstein Cable Car (Wendelstein-Seilbahn) is a  long cable car (US: aerial tramway) running from the village of Bayrischzell Osterhofen to Mount Wendelstein in the Bavarian Alps in Germany. The cabins each take up to 50 passengers, and the cable car system has a transport capacity of 450 people per hour.

The cable car has a  track rope and a  haulage rope.

See also 
 Wendelstein Rack Railway, which takes visitors to the summit from the other side of the mountain

References

External links
 Die Wendelsteinbahn (in German)
 Wendelsteinseilbahn (in German)
 Wendelsteinbahn GmbH English page
 Wendelstein Aerial pylon diagram at SkyscraperPage.com

Cable cars in Germany